The GAZ-13 Chaika (Seagull) is an automobile manufactured by the Gorkovsky Avtomobilny Zavod (GAZ, Gorky Automobile Plant) from 1959 to 1981 as a generation of its Chaika marque. It is famously noted for its styling which resembled 1950s Packard automobiles.

History
The GAZ-13 Chaika debuted in 1958. It was produced from 1959 to 1981, with 3,179 built in all. The GAZ-13 was powered by a 195-hp SAE gross 5.5 L V8 with a 4 barrel carburetor called the ZMZ-13, a modified version of which with a reduced compression ratio and smaller 2 barrel carburetor would be used on the GAZ-53 truck, along with other parts of the Chaika. and driven through a push-button automatic transmission of a similar design to the Chrysler PowerFlite unit. It was offered as a saloon (GAZ-13), limousine (GAZ-13A), and four-door cabriolet (GAZ-13B) with an electrohydraulic top. The cabriolet was made in 1961 and 1962 for official parades.

RAF in Riga produced the GAZ-13A Universal, an estate, in the 1960s in Riga; this was also built as the GAZ-13S ambulance, as well as a hearse. Produced for a few years in the 1960s, it is the lowest-volume Chaika variant. Small numbers were also built for Mosfilm. As a limousine-class car, Chaikas were available only to the Soviet government, and could not be purchased by average citizens. However, citizens were allowed to rent Chaikas for weddings. Chaikas were used by Soviet ambassadors and Communist Party First Secretaries in East Germany, North Korea, Bulgaria, Hungary, Mongolia, and Finland, among others; Fidel Castro was given one by General Secretary Nikita Khrushchev, who himself preferred the Chaika to his ZIL, and kept one at his summer dacha. He also presented one limousine version each to both King Sisavang Vatthana of Laos and Prime Minister, Prince Norodom Sihanouk of Cambodia on their visits to the Soviet Union. For their larger size and more powerful V8, Chaikas were also ordered in some quantity by the KGB.

Most Chaikas were saloons. The GAZ-13B was built for only two years 1961 and 1962. The GAZ-13 was discontinued in 1981. The GAZ-14 debuted in 1977, and ran to the end of Chaika production in 1988. 

Pyotr Masherov, First Secretary of the Communist Party of Byelorussia, was killed in 1980 when the Chaika he was travelling in collided with a GAZ-53 truck carrying potatoes.

References

Cars of Russia
GAZ Group vehicles
Soviet automobiles
Cars introduced in 1959